Justice Voorhies may refer to:

Albert Voorhies (1829–1913), associate justice of the Louisiana Supreme Court
Cornelius Voorhies (1804–1859), associate justice of the Louisiana Supreme Court

See also
John Van Voorhis (judge) (1897-1983), chief judge of the New York Court of Appeals
Henry M. Vories (1810–1876), associate justice of the Supreme Court of Missouri
Judge Voorhees (disambiguation)